is a Japanese voice actress and singer. In addition to releasing various solo CDs, Hisakawa is well known for her voice roles in anime and video games. Some of her major roles are Retsu Unohana in Bleach, Sailor Mercury in Sailor Moon, Skuld in Oh My Goddess!, Yuri Tsukikage/Cure Moonlight in HeartCatch Pretty Cure!, Kero from Cardcaptor Sakura Haruko Kamio from Air, & Michie Matsumoto from Sound! Euphonium. She performs some of her roles in her native Kansai-ben. She is affiliated with Aoni Production. On February 14, 2018, she was announced as the new voice of Bulma in the Dragon Ball series, replacing original voice actress Hiromi Tsuru, who had held the role from the original anime's debut in 1986 to her death in 2017.

Filmography

Anime

Films

Video games

Tokusatsu

Other dubbing

Drama CDs

Discography

Albums
Kyasha
Aya~Toki wo Tsumuide~
Fantasy
Hi-Ka-Ri
for you for me
MARCHING AYA
PORTRAIT
wish
yakusoku
decade: Character Song Collection 1989~1998

Singles
Sunday
Aoi Sora wo Dakishimetai
Tameiki ga Nemuranai
Kono Michi ga Owaru Made ni
Kokoro Made Dakishimeraretara
Kore wa Kore de Arikana Nante...

References 

 Nakagami, Yoshikatsu. "The Official Art of AIR". (October 2007) Newtype USA. pp. 135–141.

External links
  
 Aya Hisakawa at Hitoshi Doi's seiyuu database
 

1968 births
Living people
Anime singers
Aoni Production voice actors
Japanese women pop singers
Japanese video game actresses
Japanese voice actresses
Musicians from Osaka Prefecture
People from Kaizuka, Osaka
Voice actresses from Osaka Prefecture
20th-century Japanese actresses
21st-century Japanese actresses
20th-century Japanese women singers
20th-century Japanese singers
21st-century Japanese women singers
21st-century Japanese singers